Ratcliff is an unincorporated community in Houston County, Texas, in East Texas, United States.

Founded in the early 1900s, Ratcliff initially had a population of more than 5000, with most working at a sawmill operated by the Louisiana and Texas Lumber Company. This Four C Mill used the  lake that is the heart of Ratcliff Lake Recreation Area as its millpond. The recreation area is located within the Davy Crockett National Forest.

Ratcliff is named for an early settler, J. H. Ratcliff, who operated a smaller sawmill, which cut the timber to build the larger Four C Mill.

Gallery

External links 
 
Houston County and Crockett Area Chamber of Commerce

Unincorporated communities in Texas
Unincorporated communities in Houston County, Texas
Logging communities in the United States